Arookutty is a census town in Alappuzha district  in the state of Kerala, India.

Demographics
 India census, Arookutty had a population of 17,387. Males constitute 50% of the population and females 50%. Arookutty has an average literacy rate of 80%, higher than the national average of 59.5%; with 53% of the males and 47% of females literate. 11% of the population is under 6 years of age. It is the northern tip of a beautiful peninsula by the name Karappuram surrounded by vembanad lake in three sides.

Arookutty My Village, a documentary on the history of Arookutty, was published in 2012.
It is directed by Biju Chettukad, a history teacher at Mattathil Bhagom School

Location
The nearest major railway station is Ernakulam Junction and the nearest airport is Cochin International Airport.

Cherthala - Arookutty road runs parallel to National Highway 47.
Nearest Railway Station Aroor Railway Station.

References

Cities and towns in Alappuzha district
Suburbs of Kochi

Arookutty My Village, a documentary on the history of Arookutty, was published in 2012. It is directed by Biju Chettukad, a history teacher at Mattathil Bhagom School